It's Like You Never Left is an album by Dave Mason, released on 29 October 1973, on the CBS Records label (S65258) in the UK and by Columbia Records (PC 31721) in the US. It was reissued on CD in the US by One Way Records (A 26077) in July 1995 and Repertoire Records (RES 2320) in Europe in 2005.

Track listing

Personnel
 Dave Mason, Graham Nash (tracks: 1, 2, 5), John Batdorf (track: 6) - vocals
 Clydie King, Julia Tillman Waters, Kathleen Saroyan, Maxine Willard Waters (trackS: 3, 10) - backing vocals
 Dave Mason, George  "Son Of Harry" Harrison (track: 3) - guitar
 Mark Jordan - piano (tracks: 3, 6, 9), organ (track: 9)
 Malcolm Cecil - Moog programming (track: 7)
 Dave Mason - Moog bass synthesizer (track: 7)
 Chuck Rainey (track: 1), Carl Radle (track: 3, 9), Charles Fletcher (track: 4), Greg Reeves (tracks: 5, 10), Lonnie Turner (track: 6) - bass
 Jim Keltner (tracks: 3, 5, 9, 10), Rick Jaeger (tracks: 1, 6, 7) - drums
 Rocky Dzidzornu(tracks: 1, 7), Larry "Nastyee" Latimer (track: 10) - congas
 Denny Morouse, Norma Jean Bell, Steve Madaio (track: 6) - horns
 Stevie Wonder - harmonica (track: 9)

Production

 Producer – Dave Mason
 Co-producer – Malcolm Cecil
 Arranged By – Dave Mason
 Recorded By – Al Schmitt, Glen Kolotkin, Malcolm Cecil
 Mixed By – Al Schmitt

References

1973 albums
Dave Mason albums
Columbia Records albums
Albums produced by Dave Mason
Albums with cover art by Jimmy Wachtel